K.N. Ganeshaiah is an agricultural scientist and a Emeritus professor of the University of Agricultural Sciences, Bangalore. He is also a novelist specializing in thrillers, and writes in the Kannada language.

Science publications
Ganeshaiah is a prolific scientific author. He has
 published ~ 200 scientific papers
 edited 11 books
 authored 25 distinct works of literature
 contributed 38 chapters to other books
 published 14 papers in various meeting proceedings
 prepared 11 reference CDs
 authored 13 popular articles

Fiction
Ganeshaiah has also contributed to the literature of the Kannada language.  He has published many novels and story collections, as well as having 12 of his short stories published in various magazines.

Novels:

 Kanaka Musaku - Chandra Gupta Maurya gave up throne, travelled down south to ShravanaBelagola to spread Jainism. Being a ruler, he knew spreading religion needs tonnes and tonnes of resources. He brought with him loads of Gold, all morphed as Sweet Corn Seeds. Huge vault of Gold and it's linkages with Jain Temples (Hoysala, Ganga & other Jain Kingdoms) in Karnataka.
 Karisiryana - What made VijayaNagara Kingdom, the object of so much praise among foreign travelers? The riches of selling gems on road-side? Tuluva KrishnaDevaRaya, immigrated from Tulu speaking Mangalore, lorded over VijayaNagara & wrote epics in Telugu? What was it, in that charmed Pampa Nagari, that faced unheard ire and ended up as Haalu Hampe (laid to dust place)? What happened to all those riches?
 Kapilipisara - After Sri Rama chandra ascended throne at Ayodhya, what happened to his Vanara Sena? What if they all immigrated to Andaman? Hanuman, Sri Rama's chieftain was disillusioned after Rama abandoned his pregnant wife Seetha, to uphold his pride. What if Andaman is mispronunciation of Hanuman? Are the Jarawa and other tribes, really offspring of Vanara's, who built the famed Rama Sethu?
 Chithadantha - Buddha's teeth is revered and a prized possession. What if it was the key to the famed riches of Magadha Kingdom, which attracted conquerors across the world, including Alexander of Greece? Why was the DevanaamPriya Ashoka, the apostle of peace, also called ChandaShaasana Ashoka or Chanda Ashoka? What fuelled the rise of Chanakya's protege ChandraGupta Maurya? Did Nehru confiscate the riches in the early days of 1947?
 Elu rottigalu (2011) - Mir Osman Ali Khan, the 7'th and Last Nizam of Hyderabad, was the richest man ever who lived on Earth. He was and remains a controversial figure, whose reach was unparalleled in world-history. He even was about to anoint his sons to Caliphate and getting the entire Muslim World to fall to his feet, all through his much acclaimed and recorded riches. What was it that made him so rich? All the famed mines of Golkonda and other places? What prompted Nizam to abandon his acute hate towards Indian Government and end his flight to Prince Farookh's Palace in Egypt? Is it true that even today, his riches are being used to fuel Anti-India feelings?
 Mooka dhatu (2012)
 Shilakula valase (2014)
 "Ballikaala belli" (2017)
 "Rakta sikta Ratna" (2018)

Collection of Short/Long Stories:

 Shalabanjike  - Pratihara means Door-Keeper. Why was it that the famed Gurjara-Pratihara dynasty named as Pratihara? Why was the RashtraKoota Queen RatnaMala's face adorning Gurjara Kingdom's most revered Mural? Maalava regions of current day Madhya Pradesh has a fascinating history. Why is that the stomach part of all idols in Hoysala Temples look like a Cow? Why is that, the famed sculptors MalliTamma and his ilk not popular as Jakkanna or Jakana Aacharya? 
 Padmapani - What binds the Lotus (Padma) with Jainism? Is there more to the secrets of 24 Thirthankara's, other than spreading message of peace, harmony & love?
 Nehala
 Sigeeria (2011)  - SriLanka's chequered history criss-crosses that of India, not just for Ramayana or Tamil Natives. It is intertwined with every Century. Kunala, the blind-son of Samrat Ashoka, Sea-faring Kingdoms of Chola and Pandya's, Plantation-ships of European Colonial Rulers, SriLanka, with its great Kingdoms of DhatuSena, Kashyapa and others continues to maintain little affinity with its neighbours. Is there more than just the difference of Languages (Simhala v/s Tamil), Religions (Buddhism v/s Hinduism) or is there more? SimhaGiri or Sigiriya in Dambulla, Is it just another Fortress or something more?
 Kaldavasi (2013)
 Mihirakula (2015)
 Perini Tandava (2016)
 Aryaa Veerya (2018)
Gudi Mallam 

Collection of Articles

 Bhinna-bimba (2015)
 Bhinnota (2016)
 "V-charana" (2017)
 Taru Maaru (2018)
Hora Nota (2019)
He has written two volumes on his journey in Science and from there on to  Literature

 Sasya Sagga  (Journey in Science)
 Divy Suli (Journey from Science to literature)

Other spinoffs from literature and media work
 Four of the short stories are staged as dramas
 One 25 episode TV serial Kaala Garbha on Archeology and history.
 Authored several articles in Kannada on Science and history
He has recited important parts of Kuvempu's   Shree Ramayana Darshanam 

In total, Ganeshaiah has around 326 publications to his credit.

Education
 Ph.D.  University of Agricultural Sciences, Bangalore, India, 1983
 M.Sc. (Agriculture: Genetics & Plant Breeding), University of Agricultural Sciences, Bangalore, India, 1979
 B.Sc (Agriculture), University of Agricultural Sciences, Bangalore, India, 1976.

Honors and awards

 Fellow, Indian Academy of Sciences, Bangalore, India (1991)
 Fellow Indian National Science Academy, New Delhi (1997)
 Honorary Senior Fellow, Jawaharlal Nehru Centre for Advanced Scientific Research, Bangalore
 Parisara Prashasthi, (Karnataka State Environment Award) from the Department of Forest Ecology and Environment, Govt of Karnataka, India.
Fulbright fellowship (1991).
 Radio, Hope and Awareness Media Award     from International Radio Forum – Iran (2010)
 Vocational Excellence Award  by Rotary Club of Bangalore Yelahanka, (2008)
 Senior Fellow Ashoka Trust for Research in Ecology and Environment, Bangalore, India.
 Fellow National Academy of Agricultural Sciences, New Delhi. (2004)
 Fellow Current Science Association, Bangalore.
 Karnataka Sahitya Academy Datti Award 2008 for the Kannada novel (Kanakamusuku).
 Ganeshaiah is also a Trustee and Member of the Executive Board of ATREE.org.
 Ganeshaiah spoke at  TEDx Pilani in March 2010 on popular Indian Myths.

References

External links
 Article on the Books in Kannada
 Article on Dr. Ganeshaiah 
  Article on the book Karisiryana
 
 Article on the new book release by Dr. K.N Ganeshiah
 Ganeshaiah in TEDX speech
 Articles by Dr. K.N. Ganeshiah on current science magazine from 1980 onwards 
 Indian Biresource Information Network (IBIN)
  ಜಾತಿ ಚರ್ಚೆಗೆ ದಕ್ಕಿದ ಡಿಎನ್ನೆಯ ಕೀಲೆಣ್ಣೆ 
 ಚಿಂತನೆಗಳ ವೈರುಧ್ಯ ಮತ್ತು ನಾಳೆಯ ಜರಡಿ
 ಕೆ. ಎನ್. ಗಣೇಶಯ್ಯ: ವ್ಯಕ್ತಿ ಪರಿಚಯ ಹಾಗೂ ಪುಸ್ತಕ ವಿವರಗಳು
 Symposium on Ecology and Culture - K N Ganeshaiah a facilitation event 
 TEDxPilani - Dr Ganeshaiah - 3/13/10 
 Superannuation  

Kannada-language writers
Living people
Indian agronomists
Fellows of the Indian Academy of Sciences
Fellows of the National Academy of Agricultural Sciences
People from Kolar district
Scientists from Karnataka
20th-century Indian biologists
Year of birth missing (living people)